Tisis frimensis is a moth in the family Lecithoceridae. It was described by Kyu-Tek Park in 2005. It is found on Sabah in Malaysia.

References

Moths described in 2005
Tisis
Moths of Malaysia